Tigie Sankoh (born November 4, 1996) is a Sierra Leonean professional Canadian football defensive back for the Toronto Argonauts of the Canadian Football League (CFL).

Early life and education
Sankoh was born on November 4, 1996, in Sierra Leone. His parents moved to Maryland when he was young, and to England when he was 15. He attended high school in Croydon at Archbishop Tenison's Church of England High School.

Football career
"Missing American football," Sankoh found local teams through Google.com, joining the Kent Exiles in 2014. He moved to the South London Renegades in 2015. Sankoh scored the game-winning touchdown in a win over the London Warriors. In 2017, he was noticed by NFLUK head of football development Aden Durde who helped him join the London Warriors in England's top football division. He later got an invitation to go to Florida and train at IMG Academy in the National Football League (NFL)'s International Player Pathway Program. He was assigned to the Cleveland Browns on May 14, 2018. Sankoh was given an international roster exemption at the start of the season, and did not see any playing time. In 2021, he was signed by the Ingolstadt Praetorians. He left the team a month later after being selected with the third overall pick in the 2021 CFL Global Draft by the Toronto Argonauts. In the  CFL season, Sankoh appeared in four games, making one defensive tackle and six special teams tackles. 

To start the 2022 season, Sankoh was released with the final training camp cuts on June 5, 2022. However, he was re-signed by the team three days later on June 8, 2022.

References

External links
 Toronto Argonauts bio

1996 births
Living people
American football defensive backs
Canadian football defensive backs
Cleveland Browns players
Sierra Leonean players of American football
Sierra Leonean players of Canadian football
Toronto Argonauts players